Daniele Laumann (born July 8, 1961) is a Canadian rower. She won a bronze medal in Double sculls with her partner and sister Silken Laumann at the 1984 Los Angeles Olympic Games.

References

Canadian female rowers
Canadian people of German descent
Olympic rowers of Canada
Rowers at the 1984 Summer Olympics
Olympic bronze medalists for Canada
Living people
1961 births
Olympic medalists in rowing
Medalists at the 1984 Summer Olympics
Rowers from Toronto
20th-century Canadian women